Break-bone fever may refer to 

Dengue fever
Chikungunya virus disease, occasionally misidentified as dengue fever for hundreds of years